Wu Nien-hsuan (born 10 May 1995) is a Taiwanese actor and television host. He was nominated for a Golden Horse Award and a Golden Bell Award for his roles in the film The Tag-Along 2 (2017) and the television series Age of Rebellion (2018), respectively.

Life and career
Wu was born on 10 May 1995. He studied statistics at Tamkang University, and in 2014 he was chosen as one of twenty contestants for the Top Star project organized by Enjoy Entertainment Company. After near to two years of training, Wu debuted as the host of travel adventure show, The Burning Youth Tours, which airs weekly on SET Taiwan.

In 2016, Wu was selected out of 100 hopefuls to play the role of a spirit medium for the Tiger Lord in horror film The Tag-Along 2. The film was released on August 25, 2017. The film was a commercial success, and the performances of the cast were well received. On August 26, 2017, it was announced that Wu will appear in Age Of Rebellion, a television series directed and produced by Peter Ho, with filming beginning in September 2017.

Filmography

Film

Television series

Variety show

Music video

Awards and nominations

References

External links

 
 
 

1995 births
Living people
Taiwanese television presenters
Taiwanese male film actors
Taiwanese male television actors
21st-century Taiwanese male actors
Tamkang University alumni
Male actors from Taoyuan City